The General Mobile Radio Service (GMRS) is a land-mobile FM UHF radio service designed for short-distance two-way communication and authorized under part 95 of 47 USC. It requires a license in the United States, but some GMRS compatible equipment can be used license-free in Canada.  The US GMRS license is issued for a period of 10 years by the FCC. The United States permits use by adult individuals who possess a valid GMRS license, as well as their immediate family members. Immediate relatives of the GMRS system licensee are entitled to communicate among themselves for personal or business purposes, but employees of the licensee who are not family members are not covered by the license. Non-family members must be licensed separately.

GMRS radios are typically handheld portable devices much like Family Radio Service (FRS) radios, and they share a frequency band with FRS near 462 and 467 MHz.  Mobile and base station-style radios are available as well, but these are normally commercial UHF radios as often used in the public service and commercial land mobile bands.  These are legal for use in this service as long as they are certified for GMRS under USC 47 Part 95.

GMRS licensees are allowed to establish repeaters to extend their communications range.  GMRS repeaters are permitted to be linked with other GMRS repeaters but are not authorized to connect to the public switched telephone network.

Licensing
Any individual in the United States who is at least 18 years of age and not a representative of a foreign government may apply for a GMRS license by completing the application form, either on paper or online through the FCC's Universal Licensing System.  No exam is required. A GMRS license is issued for a 10–year term.
The current fee was reduced to $35 for all applicants on April 19, 2022.

A GMRS individual license extends to immediate family members and authorizes them to use the licensed system. GMRS license holders are allowed to communicate with FRS users on those frequencies that are shared between the two services. GMRS individual licenses do not extend to employees.

New GMRS licenses are being issued only to individuals. Prior to July 31, 1987, the FCC issued GMRS licenses to non-individuals (corporations, partnerships, government entities, etc.). These licensees are grandfathered and may renew but not make major modifications to their existing licenses.

In any case, each GMRS station must be identified by transmission of its FCC-assigned call sign at the end of a transmission or a series of transmissions, and at least once every 15 minutes for a series lasting more than 15 minutes. The call sign may be spoken or sent with audible tones using Morse code. A repeater station handling properly identified transmissions of others is not required to send its own station identification.

Range
As with other UHF radio services, reliable range is considered to be line-of-sight and the distance to the radio horizon can be estimated based on antenna height. Theoretically, the range between two hand-held units would be about one or two miles (about 1.5–3 km); mobile units have higher antennas and a range of around 5 miles (8 km). A GMRS repeater with an antenna that is high above the surrounding terrain can extend the usable range over a wide area – for example, up to a 20–mile (32.2 km) radius around the repeater station. Obstructions such as hills and buildings can reduce range. Higher power does not necessarily give a proportional increase in range, although it may improve the reliability of communication at the limits of line-of-sight distance.

Frequency assignments 
GMRS is allotted 30 frequency channels in the vicinity of 462 MHz and 467 MHz.  They are divided into 16 main channels and 14 interstitial channels.

Licensees may use the eight main 462 MHz channels for simplex communication or repeater outputs.

The eight main 467 MHz channels may only be used as repeater inputs, in conjunction with the 462 MHz channels as outputs.  The repeater input frequencies are exclusive to GMRS, and may be used only by licensed GMRS operators.

GMRS operators are permitted to transmit at up to 50 watts transmitter power output, on the 16 main channels, but transmitting 1 to 5 watts is more common in practice.

The interstitial frequencies are in-between the main channels, and the 462 MHz interstitial frequencies may be used for simplex as long as the effective radiated power does not exceed 5 watts.  The 467 MHz interstitial frequencies have a power limit of 500 milliwatts ERP, and only hand-held portable units may transmit on these channels.

Sharing with FRS 
All 22 Family Radio Service (FRS) frequencies are shared with GMRS, and users of the two services may communicate with each other.  With the exception of FRS channels 8 through 14, GMRS licensees may use higher power radios with detachable or external antennas.

Frequency table 

Table notes(1) Shared FRS and GMRS simplex.(2) Shared FRS and GMRS simplex; GMRS repeater output.(3) GMRS repeater input. The output frequency of this repeater input is the input frequency minus 5 MHz.(4) FRS transmissions are limited to bandwidth of 11 kHz with a transmitter deviation of +/- 2.5 kHz. Channels are on 12.5 kHz centers.  (5) GMRS transmissions may have a bandwidth of 16 kHz with a transmitter deviation of +/- 5.0 kHz. Channels are on 25 kHz centers.  (6) GMRS transmissions are limited to a bandwidth of 11 kHz with a transmitter deviation of +/- 2.5 kHz. Channels are on 12.5 kHz centers.  (7) National GMRS calling channel (CTCSS tone 141.3 Hz).

Note: Some inexpensive GMRS mobiles and portables do not fully comply with FCC permissible modulation bandwidth for GMRS and thus have weak transmitter audio and reduced range.

Conditions: Effective February 16, 1999, the GMRS rules have been amended and one may operate on any of the primary or interstitial channels shown in section 95.1763.  Exception: Licensees who operate North of Line A and East of Line C may not operate on channels 462.650 MHz, 467.650 MHz, 462.700 MHz and 467.700 MHz (ch. 19 and 21), unless one's previous license authorized such operations.

Bandwidth vs channel spacing
The FCC stipulates a specific channel bandwidth for FRS and GMRS. The bandwidth is constrained by the modulation which is FM deviation (GMRS = +/- 5.0 kHz, FRS = +/- 2.5 kHz) plus the uncertainties of the filtering of the transmitter and receiver. Additionally receivers and transmitters may drift over time or temperature so the bandwidth is further constrained to prevent interference to the adjacent channel. Channel spacing is 25 kHz for GMRS and so a 20 kHz bandwidth fits into that channel with protection on each side. FRS channels are spaced within a 12.5 kHz space directly between two GMRS channels. FRS radios generally utilize an 11 kHz transmitter bandwidth and a power lower than GMRS so the interference to an adjacent GMRS channel is minimized.

History
The predecessor to GMRS was named Class A Citizens Radio Service when it was commissioned in the 1960s. Tube-type transceivers were used, and transmitter power was limited to 60 watts (plate input power to the final amplifier tube). The original service ran wideband FM with ±15 kHz transmitter deviation and 50 kHz channel spacing. At the time, this was the norm for all U.S. land mobile services. There was also a Class B Citizens Radio Service which used a different set of 461 MHz channels and was limited to 5 watts output. Business users were permitted to license in this radio service. Radios were built by consumer electronics firms and commercial two-way radio vendors.

In the 1960s, the UHF 450–470 MHz band was re-allocated to 25 kHz channels. This meant transmitter deviation was reduced to ±5 kHz. This doubled the number of channels available across the entire 450–470 MHz band. Class B Citizens Radio Service channels were re-allocated to other radio services.

In the 1970s, allowed power was again changed to 50 watts across the output terminals of the transmitter. In 1987, licensing of business users was discontinued and businesses were allowed to continue operating until their licenses expired. There was congestion on all channels in larger metropolitan statistical areas and moving businesses to Business Radio Service channels would provide some relief. The radio service was changed to its present name; General Mobile Radio Service or GMRS.

In 2010 the U.S. Federal Communications Commission (FCC) proposed removing the individual licensing requirement. In 2015, the FCC ruled to keep the license requirement, but to remove the regulator fee for licensing. Adopted on May 20, 2015, the ruling would be in effect after a 90–day notification period to Congress; the fee will not be eliminated before August 18, 2015. The fee for a 5–year license was $90, with the regulatory fee portion of the license at $5 per year (or $25 for the 5–year life of the license). After the notification period, the fee for a 5–year license was to become $65. The change became effective on September 3, 2015. 

Effective September 28, 2017, FCC revised the definition of the FRS service. FRS operation is now permitted with up to 2 watts on the shared FRS/GMRS channels. The FCC will not grant certification for hybrid radios that would exceed the limits for the FRS  service on the FRS channels. Current "hybrid" FRS/GMRS radios will not require a GMRS license for power up to 2 watts, but FRS radios will still not be permitted to use the input frequencies of GMRS repeaters. Any radio exceeding the limits of the new FRS service will be classified as a GMRS radio.

On September 30, 2019, it became unlawful in the USA to import, manufacture, sell, or offer to sell radio equipment capable of operating under both GMRS and FRS.

Use of GMRS equipment in other countries
The use of radio transmitters is regulated by national laws and international agreements. Often radio equipment accepted for use in one part of the world may not be operated in other parts due to conflicts with frequency assignments and technical standards. Some of the roles that the licensed GMRS service fills in the United States are, in other countries, filled by unlicensed or class-licensed services. Generally these services have strict technical standards for equipment to prevent interference with licensed transmitters and systems.

In Canada, hand-held GMRS radios up to 2 watts have been approved for use without a license since September 2004. Typically these are dual FRS and GMRS units, with fixed antennas, and operating at 2 watts on some GMRS channels and 0.5 watts on the FRS-only channels. Mobile units (permanently mounted in vehicles), base stations and repeaters are not currently permitted on the GMRS channels in Canada.

Other countries have licensed and unlicensed personal radio services with somewhat similar characteristics, but technical details and operating conditions vary according to national rules. Many European countries use a similar 16–channel system near 446 MHz known as PMR446, as well as a 69–channel low-power LPD433 which is shared with the 433.92 MHz ISM band. GMRS equipment that is approved for use in the United States will not communicate with PMR446 radios due to using different frequency ranges.

GMRS License fee change
Currently, the application fee for a GMRS license is $35.  An FCC Report and Order released December 23, 2020, and in a subsequent notice issued by the FCC on March 23, 2022, the fee dropped from $70 to $35 starting on April 19, 2022. The license is still valid for 10 years and covers an entire family.

See also
 Multi-Use Radio Service
 Public Radio Service
 Unlicensed Personal Communications Services

References

Footnotes

External links

Bandplans
Radio technology
Radio regulations